Somdev Devvarman was the defending champion but chose not to defend his title.

Yoshihito Nishioka won the title after defeating Frances Tiafoe 6–3, 6–2 in the final.

Seeds

Draw

Finals

Top half

Bottom half

References
 Main Draw
 Qualifying Draw

Nielsen Pro Tennis Championship - Singles
2016 Singles